Hozumi Moriyama (born 5 November 1967) is a Japanese speed skater. He competed in the men's 1500 metres event at the 1988 Winter Olympics.

References

External links
 

1967 births
Living people
Japanese male speed skaters
Olympic speed skaters of Japan
Speed skaters at the 1988 Winter Olympics
Sportspeople from Hokkaido
Speed skaters at the 1990 Asian Winter Games
Medalists at the 1990 Asian Winter Games
Asian Games medalists in speed skating
Asian Games bronze medalists for Japan